The Khojaly massacre was the mass killing of at least 161 Azerbaijani civilians by Armenian forces and the 366th CIS regiment in the town of Khojaly on 25 February 1992. It has been recognized and commemorated by acts adopted in fifteen countries and in twenty-three U.S. states.

Azerbaijan  
Azerbaijan considers international recognition of the massacre as an important part of its foreign policy. The government of Azerbaijan refers to the event as a genocide, and aims to raising international awareness of the massacre, and its root causes within the Nagorno-Karabakh conflict. In 2007, Heydar Aliyev Foundation organised an exhibition of photographs and children's paintings titled "Victims of aggression" in Brussels on 26 February,  and held commemorative ceremonies in Istanbul and 25 provinces of Turkey as a part of "Khojaly Week" in 19–26 February . On 14 February 2008, the same foundation organised a conference titled "Khojaly massacre and realities of 1915 events" in Berlin.

International organizations 
The following international organisations recognise the Khojaly events as massacre:
 Human Rights Watch
 Organization of Islamic Cooperation
 Turkic Council

Parliaments and governments 

In recent years, parliaments of several countries have formally recognized the event as a massacre. The Hungarian party Jobbik stated, that they express solidarity with Azerbaijani people and issued statements during massacre's anniversary.

Countries

As massacre 
  – The House of Peoples passed a resolution condemning the Khojaly Massacre as a crime against humanity in 2014.
  – Foreign Affairs Committee of the Czech Parliament condemned the Khojaly Massacre as a crime against humanity in 2013.
  – Foreign Relations Committee of the Colombian House of Representatives recognized the Khojaly Massacre in 2013.
  – Foreign Relations Committee of the Mexican Chamber of Deputies recognised the Khojaly Massacre in 2011.
  – The National Assembly of Panama adopted a resolution condemning the Khojaly massacre in 2013.
  – The National Council of Slovenia passed a resolution condemning the Khojaly Massacre as a crime against humanity in 2016.
 – Foreign Affairs Committee of the Sudanese National Assembly recognized the Khojaly Massacre in 2014.

As genocide

 – National Assembly of Azerbaijan recognized the Khojaly massacre as genocide.
  – The National Assembly of Djibouti recognized the Khojaly Massacre as an act of genocide in 2017.
 – The Congress of Guatemala recognized the Khojaly Massacre referring to it as genocide in 2015.
  – The National Congress of Honduras recognized the Khojaly Massacre as an act of genocide in 2014.
  – Foreign Relations Committee of the Senate of Pakistan recognized the Khojaly Massacre referring to it as genocide in 2012.
  – The Parliament of Paraguay recognized the Khojaly massacre as an act of genocide in 2017.
 – The Congress of the Republic of Peru adopted a resolution recognizing the Khojaly massacre as genocide in 2013.
  – Foreign Relations Committee of the Turkish National Assembly recognised the Khojaly Massacre referring to it as genocide in 2012.
  – Estonian Parlimentary  recognized the Khojaly Massacre as genocide in 2021

U.S states 

 US State of Massachusetts commemorated the Khojaly Massacre in 2010.
 US State of Texas commemorated the Khojaly Massacre in 2011.
 US State of New Jersey commemorated the Khojaly Massacre in 2012.
 US State of Georgia commemorated the Khojaly Massacre on 28 March 2012.
 US State of Maine commemorated the Khojaly Massacre on 23 March 2012.
 US State of New Mexico commemorated the Khojaly Massacre on 28 January 2013.
 US State of Arkansas commemorated the Khojaly Massacre on 8 February 2013.
 US State of Mississippi commemorated the Khojaly Massacre on 25 February 2013.
 US State of Oklahoma commemorated the Khojaly Massacre on 4 March 2013.
 US State of Tennessee commemorated the Khojaly Massacre on 18 March 2013.
 US State of Pennsylvania commemorated the Khojaly Massacre on 18 March 2013.
 US State of West Virginia commemorated the Khojaly Massacre on 3 April 2013.
 US State of Connecticut commemorated the Khojaly Massacre on 3 April 2013.
 US State of Florida commemorated the Khojaly Massacre on 3 April 2013.
 US State of Indiana commemorated the Khojaly Massacre on 3 March 2014.
 US State of Utah commemorated the Khojaly Massacre on March 2, 2015.
 US State of Nebraska commemorated the Khojaly Massacre on February 11, 2016.
 US State of Hawaii commemorated the Khojaly Massacre on February 15, 2016.
 US State of Montana commemorated the Khojaly Massacre on 18 February 2016.
 US State of Arizona commemorated the Khojaly Massacre on 24 February 2016.
 US state of Kentucky commemorated the Khojaly Massacre on 25 February 2016
 US State of Idaho commemorated the Khojaly Massacre on 26 February 2016.
 US State of Nevada commemorated the Khojaly Massacre on 28 February 2017.
 US State of Ohio commemorated the Khojaly Massacre on 26 February 2020.
 US State of Minnesota commemorated the Khojaly Massacre on 15 February 2021.
 US State of Illinois commemorated the Khojaly Massacre on 18 February 2021.
 US State of Alabama commemorated the Khojaly Massacre on 25 February 2021.
 US State of Virginia commemorated the Khojaly Massacre on 27 February 2021.

References  

Khojaly Massacre